Peter Muduhwa (born 11 August 1993) is a Zimbabwean footballer who plays as a defender for Highlanders F.C. and the Zimbabwe national football team.

Career

International
Muduhwa made his senior international debut on 26 March 2017 in a 0-0 friendly draw with Zambia.
The defender of Zimbabwe club Highlanders, Peter Muduhwa join Tanzanian club, Simba SC, on a six month loan.

References

1993 births
Living people
Highlanders F.C. players
Zimbabwe Premier Soccer League players
Zimbabwean footballers
Zimbabwe international footballers
Association football defenders
Sportspeople from Bulawayo
2021 Africa Cup of Nations players